Marina Sedneva (born 3 March 1996) is a Kazakhstani freestyle wrestler. She won one of the bronze medals in the 55kg event at the 2019 Asian Wrestling Championships held in Xi'an, China.

Career 

She competed in the women's 58kg event at the 2017 Asian Indoor and Martial Arts Games held in Ashgabat, Turkmenistan. Here she was eliminated from the competition in her second match by Pooja Dhanda of India.

In 2019, she won the gold medal in the 55kg event at the Asian U23 Wrestling Championship held in Ulaanbaatar, Mongolia. She won one of the bronze medals in the 55kg event at the 2019 Asian Wrestling Championships held in Xi'an, China. She lost her bronze medal match in the 55kg event at the 2019 World Wrestling Championships held in Nur-Sultan, Kazakhstan.

She competed in the 55 kg event at the 2022 World Wrestling Championships held in Belgrade, Serbia. She lost her first match and she was then eliminated in her second match in the repechage by eventual bronze medalist Xie Mengyu of China.

She won one of the bronze medals in her event at the 2023 Ibrahim Moustafa Tournament held in Alexandria, Egypt.

Achievements

References

External links 
 

Living people
1996 births
Place of birth missing (living people)
Kazakhstani female sport wrestlers
Asian Wrestling Championships medalists
21st-century Kazakhstani women